Urbonas is a Lithuanian language masculine given name and surname. It corresponds to the surname Urban

Notable people with the surname include:
Gediminas Urbonas, artist and MIT professor, awarded the Lithuanian National Prize for Culture and Arts in 2007
Julijonas Urbonas, artist, perhaps best known as the designer of the Euthanasia Coaster, a hypothetical roller coaster engineered to humanely take the life of a human being
Michael J. Urbonas (died 1976), American Roman Catholic clergyman
Rolandas Urbonas, Lithuanian paralympic athlete
Valdas Urbonas (born 1967), Lithuanian footballer
Žydrūnas Urbonas (born 1976), Lithuanian basketball player

References

Lithuanian-language surnames
Lithuanian masculine given names